FC Austin Elite is an American women's soccer team, founded in 2016. The team is a member of the United Women's Soccer. They played in the Women's Premier Soccer League  in 2016 & 2017.

The team plays its home games at the Round Rock Multipurpose Complex in Round Rock, Texas. The team colors are black and red.

Year-by-year

References

External links
 Official Site
 UWS Official Site

Austin Elite
Austin Elite
Soccer clubs in Texas
Sports in Austin, Texas
Round Rock, Texas
2016 establishments in Texas
Association football clubs established in 2016